Koos Meinderts (born 20 January 1953) is a Dutch writer of children's literature.

Career 

Meinderts made his debut in 1983 with the children's book Mooi meegenomen.

In 2016, he won the Boekenleeuw for his book De zee zien. In 2017, he won the Gouden Griffel for his book Naar het noorden.

Meinderts won the Vlag en Wimpel award three times: in 2003 for the book Keizer en de verhalenvader, in 2018 for the book Dag poes! together with Bette Westera, Sjoerd Kuyper, Hans Hagen and Monique Hagen and in 2019 for the book De schelmenstreken van Reinaert de Vos.

In 2019, his book De Club van Lelijke Kinderen (The Club of Ugly Children) was made into a movie by Jonathan Elbers.

Awards 

 2003: Vlag en Wimpel, Keizer en de verhalenvader
 2016: Boekenleeuw, De zee zien
 2017: Zilveren Griffel, Naar het noorden
 2017: Gouden Griffel, Naar het noorden
 2018: Vlag en Wimpel, Dag poes! (with Bette Westera, Sjoerd Kuyper, Hans Hagen, Monique Hagen)
 2019: Vlag en Wimpel, De schelmenstreken van Reinaert de Vos

References

External links 
 Koos Meinderts (in Dutch), Digital Library for Dutch Literature

1953 births
Living people
Dutch children's writers
Gouden Griffel winners
Boekenleeuw winners
20th-century Dutch people